Washington Luiz Mascarenhas Silva (born August 23, 1978 in São José dos Campos), or simply Washington, is a Brazilian striker who was the top striker in Copa Libertadores 2006 playing for Palmeiras, scoring five goals.

Honours

Individual
Copa Libertadores Top Scorer : 2006

Team
Pernambuco State League: 2007

External links

Sousport
Konyaspor

Living people
1978 births
People from São José dos Campos
Association football forwards
Brazilian footballers
Brazilian expatriate footballers
Super League Greece players
Xanthi F.C. players
Expatriate footballers in Greece
CR Vasco da Gama players
Sociedade Esportiva e Recreativa Caxias do Sul players
Associação Portuguesa de Desportos players
Sociedade Esportiva Palmeiras players
J1 League players
FC Tokyo players
Expatriate footballers in Japan
Sport Club do Recife players
Süper Lig players
Konyaspor footballers
Expatriate footballers in Turkey
Esporte Clube Vitória players
Associação Desportiva São Caetano players
Ceará Sporting Club players
ABC Futebol Clube players
Brasiliense Futebol Clube players
Duque de Caxias Futebol Clube players
Clube Atlético Bragantino players
Footballers from São Paulo (state)